This is a list of Pakistan Super League umpires, this is officials who have stood as an on-field umpire in a cricket match during the Pakistan Super League. There are two on-field umpires who apply the laws, make decisions and relay the decisions to the scorers during a cricket match.

The Pakistan Super League was established in 2016 as a franchise Twenty20 cricket league administered by the Pakistan Cricket Board. Seven umpires were announced prior to the first season. For the second and third season, eight umpire names were announced.

Key

PSL umpires

Source: ESPNcricinfo, Last updated: 27 February 2022

References

Cricket umpires
umpires